The San Antonio and Mexican Gulf Railroad (SA&MG) was a railroad set up in 1850 to connect the city of San Antonio to the Gulf of Mexico.  The railroad survived the Civil War and merged with the Indianola Railroad into the Gulf, Western Texas and Pacific Railway in 1871.

History of the road
The SA&MG was chartered on September 5, 1850, with plans to connect Lavaca, Texas, later changed to Port Lavaca, Texas to San Antonio. Trackwork began in 1856, and a line was completed to Victoria, Texas in April, 1861, when the Civil War broke out. Among the founders of the railroad were German-born railroad engineer Gustav Schleicher and Joseph E. Johnston who was an army officer stationed in San Antonio, who would later be a General in the Confederate army.

To facilitate the construction of a railroad from the Gulf to San Antonio, the SA&MG received  of land from the State.

During the Civil War
Confederate General John B. Magruder ordered the destruction of the San Antonio and Mexican Gulf to prevent its falling into the hands of enemy forces.  The railroad was rebuilt by the United States government in 1865-66.

End of the road
The San Antonio and Mexican Gulf never did connect to the Gulf coast, stopping short in Victoria. On August 4, 1870, the Texas legislature authorized the consolidation of two rail lines, the Indianola Railroad Company and the San Antonio and Mexican Gulf Railroad Company, into a new corporation to be called the Gulf, Western Texas and Pacific Railway.

References

Defunct Texas railroads
Railway companies established in 1850
Railway companies disestablished in 1871
Predecessors of the Southern Pacific Transportation Company
5 ft 6 in gauge railways in the United States